In mathematics, the Brascamp–Lieb inequality is either of two inequalities. The first is a result in geometry concerning integrable functions on n-dimensional Euclidean space . It generalizes the Loomis–Whitney inequality and Hölder's inequality. The second is a result of probability theory which gives a concentration inequality for log-concave probability distributions. Both are named after Herm Jan Brascamp and Elliott H. Lieb.

The geometric inequality

Fix natural numbers m and n. For 1 ≤ i ≤ m, let ni ∈ N and let ci > 0 so that

Choose non-negative, integrable functions

and surjective linear maps

Then the following inequality holds:

where D is given by

Another way to state this is that the constant D is what one would obtain by restricting attention to the case in which each  is a centered Gaussian function, namely .

Relationships to other inequalities

The geometric Brascamp–Lieb inequality

The geometric Brascamp–Lieb inequality is a special case of the above, and was used by  Keith Ball, in 1989, to provide upper bounds for volumes of central sections of cubes.

For i = 1, ..., m, let ci > 0 and let ui ∈ Sn−1 be a unit vector; suppose that ci and ui satisfy

for all x in Rn. Let fi ∈ L1(R; [0, +∞]) for each i = 1, ..., m. Then

The geometric Brascamp–Lieb inequality follows from the Brascamp–Lieb inequality as stated above by taking ni = 1 and Bi(x) = x · ui. Then, for zi ∈ R,

It follows that D = 1 in this case.

Hölder's inequality

Then

and the log-concavity of the determinant of a positive definite matrix implies that D = 1. This yields Hölder's inequality in :

The concentration inequality

Consider a probability density function . This probability density function  is said to be a log-concave measure if the  function is convex.

Formally, let  be any derivable function. The Brascamp–Lieb inequality reads:

Relationship with other inequalities

The Brascamp–Lieb inequality is an extension of the Poincaré inequality which only concerns Gaussian probability distributions.

The Brascamp–Lieb inequality is also related to the Cramér–Rao bound. The expressions are almost identical:

.

References

 

Geometric inequalities